Philip Alan Spiller is a former National Football League player. He was drafted in the 16th round (No. 410 overall) of the 1967 NFL Draft by the St. Louis Football Cardinals as a Defensive Back (DB).  He played the 1967 and part of the 1968 seasons for St. Louis, but was traded in 1968 to the 1st year fledgling expansion team the AFC Cincinnati Bengals and to the 2nd year NFC Atlanta Falcons.

Spiller was a college standout in 1965 and 1966 as a player for the nationally ranked Cal State Los Angeles Diablos. The 1966 team was undefeated and nationally ranked by the UPI and AP sportswriters.

Spiller only played a few seasons in the NFL.  He retired and became a builder and developer having graduated from Cal State LA with a degree in Real Estate.  He has been married 4 times and has 3 children.

References

St. Louis Cardinals (football) players
Atlanta Falcons players
Cincinnati Bengals players
American football defensive backs
1945 births
Players of American football from Santa Monica, California
Living people
American Football League players